In typography and handwriting, a superior letter is a lower-case letter placed above the baseline and made smaller than ordinary script. The style has traditionally been distinct from superscript. Formerly quite common in abbreviations, the original purpose was to make handwritten abbreviations clearly distinct from normal words. These could also be used to enable the important words on signs to be larger. In technical terms, the superior letter can also be called the superscripted minuscule letter. In modern usage, with word processors and text entry interfaces, superscript and superior letters are produced in the same way and look identical, and their distinction would refer to their usage and not to their form.

With the coming of printing, pieces of type were cast to enable them to appear in print. These are still commonly used in French, Italian, Portuguese and Spanish, though their appearance in English has diminished. Not every letter in the alphabet has a piece of type cast for it as a superior letter. In the book Thinking in Type, by Alex W. White, it is stated that there are only twelve superior letters used in French and Spanish: a, b, d, e, i, l, m, n, o, r, s, and t. However, a few other superior letters are also used those languages, for example in English, h is also sometimes rendered as a superior letter, or in French, superior g is used in some abbreviations (See below).

Use in French

In French, certain abbreviations are written with the first letter(s) of the word they represent, followed by the final letter(s) in superscript. The superscript in this case is sometimes optional.

When ordinal numbers are abbreviated, superscript letters are generally used:
 : 1er ('first')
 : XXe  ('twentieth century')
 : 400e ('four hundredth')
 : Nième ('nth')

Use in Spanish
At present, these letters are usually not underlined, though underlining them is acceptable. It is ruled that a period must be added immediately before them, despite the fact that this norm is often ignored.

Superior letters are used to shorten various words in order to save space: f.o ( 'page'); titles: D.a ( 'Lady, Ms.'); personal compound given names: M.a Cristina and regular administrative expressions: imp.to ( 'tax').

For singular ordinal numbers, shortened forms use the feminine and masculine ordinal indicators, rather than the superscript a and o, except in ordinal numbers ending in -er (only before masculine singular sustantives for ordinal numbers whose cardinal equivalent finishes in 1 and 3, except with the 11.º variant spelled ).

: 1.ª, : 1.º, : 1.er ('first')
: 2.ª, : 2.º, : 2.do ('second')
: 3.ª, : 3.º, : 3.er ('third')
: 21.ª, : 21.º, : 21.er ('twenty-first')
: 25.ª, : 25.º ('twenty-fifth')

For plural ordinal numbers, shortened forms use the superscript as and os:
: 1.as, : 1.os ('firsts')
: 2.as, : 2.os ('seconds')
: 3.as, : 3.os ('thirds')

Use in English

In English, superior letters are reserved for use with ordinal numerals, though this use is not mandatory and not always preferred: 1st, 2nd, 3rd, etc.

Previously, in English-speaking countries, abbreviations of given names were used for recordkeeping. Today, their use is very uncommon, and they are generally only found in historical records. These abbreviations sometimes employed superior letters; for example, Alexr for Alexander, Nics for Nicholas.

Masculine and feminine ordinal indicators
Most typewriters for Spanish and other Romance languages had keys that could enter o and a directly, as a shorthand intended to be used primarily with ordinal numbers, such as 1.o for first.

In computing, early 8-bit character sets as code page 437 for the original IBM PC (circa 1981) also had these characters. In ISO-8859-1 Latin-1, and later in Unicode, they were assigned to and are known as U+00AA FEMININE ORDINAL INDICATOR (ª) and U+00BA MASCULINE ORDINAL INDICATOR (º). Here, "feminine" and "masculine" refers to grammatical gender. In Spanish, Portuguese, Galician and Italian, gender is usually distinguished by the suffixes -a and -o. These ordinal indicators are now distinct from the superior o and a characters. In most of the commonly available computer fonts today, ordinal indicators are not underlined.

 Numero sign 

One abbreviation using a superior letter, the numero sign, has been given its own character: №. Originally, this was just another use of a superior o, abbreviating numero, the word for 'number' in several Romance languages. It often appears in English, for example in № 2 pencil, for 'number-two pencil'.

In Unicode, it is assigned to character U+2116 NUMERO SIGN (№) within the Letterlike Symbols block.

nth power of a number
Both the code page 437 (position 252) and Unicode (U+207F SUPERSCRIPT LATIN SMALL LETTER N) have the character ⁿ to represent the n''th power of a number or variable in mathematics, for example 3ⁿ.

Phonetic transcription 
Several superior letters are used in phonetic transcription systems. The International Phonetic Alphabet uses the superscript n ⁿ for nasal release, the superscript w ʷ to indicate labialized or labio-velarized consonants, the superscript h ʰ for aspirated consonants, the superscript j ʲ for palatalized consonants, the superscript gamma ᵞ for velarized consonants, the superscript turned h ᶣ for labio-palatalized consonants, the superscript reversed glottal stop for pharyngealized consonants, the superscript glottal stop is used for glottalized but pulmonic sonorants, such as [mˀ], [lˀ], [wˀ], [aˀ].
Other superscript letters are used as an alternative way to represent double articulated consonants, for example [tˢ] for [t͡s].

See also 
Subscript and superscript
Unicode subscripts and superscripts
Ordinal indicator
Numero sign
Degree sign

References

Typography